Sarmaty Orenburg is a junior ice hockey team based in Orenburg, Russia. 

Founded in 2015, they play in the Eastern Conference of the Russian under-20 Junior Hockey League (MHL).

Players

Controversy 
In early 2023, the doctor for the team, Alexander Zhukov, died under suspicious circumstances. While no official cause of death has been published, some suspect that his death may be related to his practices of protesting the War in Ukraine.

In January of 2023, the former head coach for the team, Vladimir Gromilin, was fired by the team's management for physically abusing a player, Yegor Razumnyak. This comes after a long string of coaches being fired for abuse of the team's young and often underage players. Former head coach Artur Ruslanov was fired in 2019 for allegedly being in a homosexual relationship with then-underage player Samuil Danilov. Ruslanov has not yet faced trial as his trial date was delayed due to the COVID-19 pandemic.

References

External links
 Official website

2015 establishments in Russia
Ice hockey clubs established in 2015
Ice hockey teams in Russia
Junior Hockey League (Russia) teams